"Better Days" is the first single from American singer-songwriter Bruce Springsteen's 10th studio album, Lucky Town. On Rolling Stone, "Better Days" was ranked at number 70 on their list of the 100 best Bruce Springsteen songs.

"Better Days" was originally released in the United States in March 1992 as a double A side with "Human Touch", reaching No. 16 on Billboard Hot 100, and the second position on the US Mainstream Rock chart.

Track listings
7-inch single
 Better Days – 4:08
 Tougher Than the Rest (Live from L.A. Sports Arena April 27, 1988) – 6:30

CD single
 Better Days – 4:08
 Tougher Than the Rest (Live) – 6:30
 Part Man, Part Monkey – 4:29

Chart performance

References

1992 songs
Songs written by Bruce Springsteen
Bruce Springsteen songs
1992 singles
Columbia Records singles
Song recordings produced by Jon Landau
Song recordings produced by Bruce Springsteen
Song recordings produced by Chuck Plotkin